Kazakhstan–Spain relations refers to the bilateral relations between Kazakhstan and Spain. Both nations are members of the Organization for Security and Co-operation in Europe.

History
After the dissolution of the Soviet Union, Kazakhstan became an independent nation in December 1991. On 11 February 1992, Kazakhstan and Spain established diplomatic relations. In 1999, Spain opened a resident embassy in the former capital of Almaty before moving the embassy to Astana in 2006. That same year, Kazakhstan opened a resident embassy in Madrid.

Since the initial establishment of diplomatic relations, both nations have worked closely within multinational forums such as the Organization for Security and Co-operation in Europe. In 2017, Spain participated in the Expo 2017 being held in Nur-sultan.

High-level visits
High-level from Kazakhstan to Spain

 President Nursultan Nazarbayev (2008, 2013)

High-level from Spain to Kazakhstan

 King Juan Carlos I (2007)
 Prime Minister José Luis Rodríguez Zapatero (2011)
 Prime Minister Mariano Rajoy (2013)

Agreements
Since 1992, both nations have signed several bilateral agreements such as Agreement on the Reciprocal Promotion and Protection of Investments (1995); Agreement on Economic and Industrial Cooperation (1997); Agreement on Cultural, Educational and Scientific Cooperation (1997); Agreement to transport equipment and military personnel through Kazakh territory for Spanish stabilization and reconstruction in Afghanistan (2009); Agreement on the Elimination of Visas for Diplomatic Passport Holders (2009); Agreement on Tourism Cooperation (2009); Extradition Treaty (2012) and an Agreement on Military Cooperation (2013).

Trade
In 2015, trade between Kazakhstan and Spain totaled €1.3 billion Euros. Kazakhstan's main exports to Spain include: combustibles and lubricants, copper based products, inorganic chemical products, steel products and electrical equipment. Spain's main exports to Kazakhstan include: vehicles, air navigation equipment, construction equipment, clothing and shoes. Several Spanish multinational companies such as Obrascón Huarte Lain, Repsol, Talgo and Zara operate in Kazakhstan.

Resident diplomatic missions
 Kazakhstan has an embassy in Madrid and a consulate in Barcelona.
 Spain has an embassy in Nur-sultan.

See also  
 Foreign relations of Kazakhstan 
 Foreign relations of Spain

References 

 
Spain
Bilateral relations of Spain